The Alfa Romeo 179 is a Formula One car which was used (in different variants) by the Alfa Romeo team from  to . The 179 made its debut at the 1979 Italian Grand Prix, replacing the flat-12 engined Alfa Romeo 177. During its lifespan there were many versions and 179D version was used for the last time at the 1982 South African Grand Prix.

Alfa Romeo hired Frenchman Patrick Depailler for the 1980 season; Depailler had a good reputation as a testing and development driver, and this proved invaluable for the 179's competitiveness. The car was far from competitive at the first races of the season in Argentina and Brazil; Depailler and his teammate Bruno Giacomelli qualified at the back of the grid for both races even though the former finished 5th in Argentina. But a month later in South Africa the car had become far better and Depailler qualified 6th on the grid, and another 4 weeks later at Long Beach the Alfa had improved even further and Depailler qualified the car an amazing 3rd on the grid, whilst Giacomelli qualified 6th. Although Alfa Romeo did not win a race that season largely due to horrendous unreliability, they were often up there with the front runners, although the team's season was marred by the death of Depailler at a testing session at Hockenheim in Germany when he crashed horrendously and went into trees after blacking out whilst taking the ultra-fast Ostkurve nearly flat out at 270 km/h (170 mph). Giacomelli bravely raced at Hockenheim a week later, finishing 5th. But the team ended the season on a positive note, with Depallier's testing not having gone in vain when Giacomelli stuck his Alfa on pole at the last race of the season at Watkins Glen; he led most of the race until electrical failure put him out of the race.

At the beginning of the  season, the 179s were fitted with adjustable dampers and denoted as 179C.
A lower 179D was the next evolution and the final version which raced was the fully carbon-fibre 179F.

There was also a V8-engined test mule of this car, the 179T in 1982, which was used to test the new 1.5 L turbocharged engine.

The 179's best achievements were Bruno Giacomelli's pole position at the 1980 United States Grand Prix at Watkins Glen and 3rd place in the 1981 Caesars Palace Grand Prix. The car scored 14 points from 61 races.

Non-Championship races 
Following the  season, Alfa entered one of their 179s, with Giacomelli doing the driving, in the non-championship 1980 Australian Grand Prix at the Calder Park Raceway in Melbourne. The race that year was open to Formula One, Formula 5000 and Formula Pacific cars with the Alfa, along with the Williams-Ford of 1980 World Champion, Australian Alan Jones, being the only F1 cars in the race. Calder circuit owner and race promoter Bob Jane invited the factory Alfa team in the hopes of attracting spectators from Melbourne's large Italian community (a ploy that, along with the presence of Jones, saw a capacity crowd on race day). Giacomelli qualified second behind Jones (and easily faster than the F5000 cars) and after showing surprising speed and taking the lead from Jones part-way through the race, eventually finished a lap behind the Williams in second place.

Variants:

Complete Formula One results
(key) (results in bold indicate pole position)

Notes 

179
1979 Formula One season cars
1981 Formula One season cars